Matthew Bennett (born 1968) is a Canadian actor, writer and director.

Matthew Bennett or Matt Bennett may also refer to:
Matt Bennett (born 1991), American actor (Victorious)
Matthew Bennett (cricketer) (born 1982), English cricketer
Matthew Bennett (geographer), British geologist 
Matthew Bennett (historian) (born 1954), British military historian and Sandhurst lecturer
Matthew Bennett (lacrosse) (born 1993), Canadian lacrosse player
Matthew Bennett (politician) (1862–1951), Australian politician
Matthew Bennett (TV producer), American television producer